Ectoplasm may refer to:

Biology
 Ectoplasm (cell biology), the outer part of the cytoplasm
 Ectoplasm, outer layer of soft tissue in foraminiferans

Art and entertainment
 Ectoplasm (radio show), BBC Radio 4 comedy series
 Ectoplasm (My Hero Academia), a character in the manga series My Hero Academia

Other uses
 Ectoplasm (paranormal), physically sensible phenomenon claimed to be due to "energy" described as paranormal